Cheryl Lynn "Cherry" Boone (born July 7, 1954), also known as Cherry Boone O'Neill, is an American writer, author, and singer. She and her three sisters formed the 1970s pop singing group, The Boones. Boone has spoken publicly about her experiences and recovery from anorexia nervosa.

Biography
Boone was born in Denton, Texas, the first daughter of Pat Boone and Shirley Lee Foley Boone. She is the granddaughter of country music star Red Foley. She has three sisters: Debby, Lindy, and Laury. The four sisters formed a vocal group, The Boones, in the 1970s. They were best known for their cover of ABBA's "Hasta Mañana".

On October 4, 1975, Boone married writer Dan O'Neill, in a ceremony officiated by Jack Hayford, founding pastor of the Church on the Way, in Van Nuys, California. Dan and Cherry have since converted to Catholicism. Her husband was a co-founder of the relief organization Mercy Corps. They have four daughters and a son, Brittany (born 1981), Brendan (born 1983), Casey (born 1986), Kevyn (born 1989), and Kylie (born 1992). The family resides in Sammamish, Washington.

Anorexia nervosa
Boone came to public attention after the death of her friend, pop singer Karen Carpenter, who died in 1983 from complications arising from anorexia nervosa. They had met in 1982 while Carpenter was attending resident therapy in New York City with psychotherapist Steven Levenkron. At that time Boone was a recovered anorexic and former patient. Later that year, she published Starving for Attention about her recovery and life as a former sufferer of anorexia.

Writing background
In 1985, Boone and her husband wrote the book Dear Cherry: Questions and Answers on Eating Disorders, which was a response to letters and questions which she had received after the publication of her first book, Starving for Attention. They later wrote a follow-up book Living on the Border of Disorder: How to Cope with an Addictive Person.

Published works
Starving for Attention, Continuum, 1982. 
Dear Cherry: Questions and Answers on Eating Disorders Continuum, 1987. 
Living on the Border of Disorder: How to Cope with an Addictive Person, Bethany House, 1992.

References

External links

1954 births
Living people
American health and wellness writers
American memoirists
American self-help writers
People from Denton, Texas
Anorexia nervosa
People from Sammamish, Washington
American women memoirists
Boone family (show business)
Converts to Roman Catholicism
Catholics from Texas
Catholics from Washington (state)
21st-century American women